Mohadi  Taluka, is a Taluka in Tumsar subdivision of Bhandara district in Maharashtra State of India.

Geographic Boundaries

References 

Talukas in Maharashtra
Bhandara district